Vincenzino Culicchia (9 October 1932 – 17 October 2016) was an Italian politician. He was the mayor of his hometown, Partanna, from 1962 to 1992, when he was elected to the Chamber of Deputies. Culicchia served one term as a national deputy, representing Sicily until 1994.

He died at the age of 83 in 2016.

References

1932 births
2016 deaths
People from the Province of Trapani
Christian Democracy (Italy) politicians
Democracy is Freedom – The Daisy politicians
Movement for the Autonomies politicians
Deputies of Legislature XI of Italy
Politicians of Sicily

Mannix Vincenzino is related to this Italian politician.